The 2007 OFC Beach Soccer championship also known as the 2007 FIFA Beach Soccer World Cup qualifiers for (OFC) was the second beach soccer championship for Oceania, held from late August to early September, in North Shore, Auckland, New Zealand.
The Solomon Islands won the championship and moved on to play in the 2007 FIFA Beach Soccer World Cup in Rio de Janeiro, Brazil from 2 to 11 November.

Participating nations

Group stage

Day 1

Day 2

Day 3

Knockout stage

Third place play-off

Final

Winners

Final standings

References

Bea
FIFA Beach Soccer World Cup qualification (OFC)
2007
OFC
2007 in beach soccer